Donald J. Sinta (born June 16, 1937 in Detroit, Michigan) is an American classical saxophonist, educator, and administrator. Mr. Sinta earned a Master of Music degree in saxophone performance from the University of Michigan in 1962.

In 1969, he was the first elected chair of the World Saxophone Congress.

Performing career
Donald Sinta specializes in contemporary music for the saxophone. He has gained prominence as an interpreter of modern music, is known for his technical abilities as well as his musical interpretation, and is highly regarded for his incorporation of the orchestral string tradition into the language of modern concert saxophone. He has also performed with many major orchestras, including the Detroit Symphony Orchestra, as well as other ensembles. Here is a sample: (1975 with the UAH Wind Ensemble in Huntsville, Alabama. His solos are scattered throughout...) https://www.dropbox.com/sh/3iefsvfnctwymix/AADLgPvyeiS8PIqsSzqP7BbAa/1976_05_05%20UAH%20Wind%20Ensemble%20(Don%20Sinta%2C%20soloist)?dl=0&preview=05+Pop+Medley+(arr+Sinta).mp3&subfolder_nav_tracking=1

Teaching career
He served as Arthur F. Thurnau Professor and Earl V. Moore Professor of Saxophone at the University of Michigan in Ann Arbor, Michigan from 1974 - 2014.

He previously served on the music faculties of the Hartt School of Music and Ithaca College.

Sinta is the emeritus director of the Michigan Youth Ensembles Program, the Michigan All-State program at Interlochen Arts Camp and director of the MPulse Ann Arbor Saxophone Institute.

References

University of Michigan faculty
American classical saxophonists
American male saxophonists
Cass Technical High School alumni
Ithaca College faculty
1937 births
Living people
Contemporary classical music performers
University of Hartford Hartt School faculty
Classical saxophonists
Musicians from Detroit
21st-century American saxophonists
Classical musicians from Michigan
21st-century American male musicians
University of Michigan School of Music, Theatre & Dance alumni